, better known by his ring name Ryusei, is a Japanese kickboxer. He currently competes in the featherweight division of KNOCK OUT, where he is the incumbent KNOCK OUT Black Featherweight champion.

Between August and September 2022, he was the #10 ranked Super Flyweight kickboxer in the world by Combat Press.

Kickboxing career

KNOCK OUT

Early career
Ryusei made his professional debut against Naoki Iijima at Suk Wan Kingthong on April 7, 2019. He won the fight by a first-round knockout. Ryusei was next booked to face Shoi at REBELS 62 on August 10, 2019. He won the fight by a first-round knockout.

Ryusei made his debut with KNOCK OUT, the REBELS sister organization, against Miki Urabayashi at KNOCK OUT CHAMPIONSHIP.1 on February 11, 2020. He won the fight by a second-round technical knockout. Ryusei next faced Hiroto Sameshima at Suk Wan Kingthong Rookies on July 19, 2020. He won the fight by a third-round technical knockout.

Ryusei faced Yuki Chiba at REBELS 65 on August 30, 2020. He won the fight by a first-round knockout, after knocking Chiba down three times by the 1:59 minute mark of the opening round. Ryusei was then booked to face KotaroZLS at REBELS 69 on December 6, 2020. He knocked Kotaro out with a head kick, only 51 seconds into the fight.

Ryusei faced Takeru Owaki at KNOCK OUT ～The REBORN～ on March 13, 2021. He won the fight by unanimous decision, the first decision win of his professional career. One judge scored the fight 30–28 in his favor, while the remaining two judges awarded him all three rounds of the bout. Ryusei made his third KNOCK OUT appearance against Ryuta Inoue at KNOCK OUT EX 2021 vol.4 on August 22, 2021. He won the fight by a first-round technical knockout, forcing the referee to step in with a flurry of punches at the 2:00 minute mark.

Black Featherweight champion
Ryusei's undefeated 8–0 run earned him the chance to fight Ginji for the inaugural  KNOCK OUT Black Featherweight title at KNOCK OUT 2021 vol.5 on October 29, 2021. He utilized his height and reach advantage to win the fight by unanimous decision, with all three judges awarding him the first and the second round on their scorecards. Following this victory, eFight named Ryusei their October 2021 "Fighter of the Month".

Ryusei faced Mehdi Jraifi, the first foreign opponent of his career, in a non-title bout at KNOCK OUT 2022 vol.3 on April 17, 2022. The fight was ruled a split decision draw after the first three rounds, with one judge scoring the fight 30–29 for Ryusei, while the remaining two judges scored it as an even 29–29 draw. An extra fourth round was contested, after which Ryusei was awarded the split decision.

Ryusei made his Rizin FF debut against Kaishi at Rizin 37 - Saitama on July 31, 2022. He won the fight by a third-round knockout, stopping Kaishi with a combination of a left hook and a flying knee.

Ryusei faced Yukinori Ogasawara at KNOCK OUT 2022 vol.5 on September 23, 2022. It was Ryusei's first fight following his departure from TRY HARD gym. He stopped his opponent with a knee to the body, after just 66 seconds. Ryusei next faced Gu Taewon at KNOCK OUT 2022 vol.7 on November 19, 2022. He won the fight by a second-round head kick knockout.

Ryusei faced Dawsakorn Mor.Tassanai at INOKI BOM-BA-YE x Ganryujima on December 28, 2022, in a ganryujima rules bout, which was contested in MMA gloves and allowed for throws and chokes. Ryusei won by first round knockout with a left hook to the body only 31 seconds into the bout.

Ryusei was expected to face Yodkitsada Yuthachonburi at KNOCK OUT 2023 SUPER BOUT BLAZE on March 5, 2023. Yodkitsada withdrew on February 8 and was replaced by the Rajadamnern Stadium super bantamweight champion Petchsansab SorJor Tongprajin. The fight was ruled a majority decision draw after the first three rounds, with one judge scoring the bout 30–28 for Ryusei, while the remaining two judges scored it as an even 29–29 draw. Ryusei was awarded a unanimous decision, 10–8 on all three scorecards, after an extra round was contested.

Titles and accomplishments

Amateur
 2015 Wan Kingthong Real Champion -38kg Tournament runner-up
 2017 WINDY Super Fight Kick -51kg Champion

Professional
KNOCK OUT
 2021 KNOCK OUT Black Featherweight Championship

Awards
eFight.jp
Fighter of the Month (October 2021)

Kickboxing record

|-  style="text-align:center; background:#cfc;"
| 2023-03-05 || Win||align=left| Petchsansaeb Sor.Jor Tongprachin || KNOCK OUT 2023 SUPER BOUT BLAZE  || Tokyo, Japan || Ext.R Decision (Unanimous) || 4 || 3:00

|-  style="text-align:center; background:#cfc;"
| 2022-11-19 || Win ||align=left| Gu Taewon|| KNOCK OUT 2022 vol.7  || Tokyo, Japan || KO (Left high kick) ||2 ||0:26

|-  style="text-align:center; background:#cfc;"
| 2022-09-23|| Win ||align=left| Yukinori Ogasawara || KNOCK OUT 2022 vol.5  || Tokyo, Japan || KO (Knee to the body)  || 1||1:06

|-  bgcolor="#cfc"
| 2022-07-31|| Win||align=left| Kaishi || Rizin 37 - Saitama || Saitama, Japan || KO (Left body hook + knee) || 3 || 1:23

|-  bgcolor="#cfc"
| 2022-04-17|| Win||align=left| Mehdi Jraifi ||KNOCK OUT 2022 vol.3 || Tokyo, Japan || Ext.R Decision (Split) || 4 || 3:00

|-  style="text-align:center; background:#cfc;"
| 2021-10-29|| Win ||align=left| Ginji || KNOCK OUT 2021 vol.5  || Tokyo, Japan || Decision (Unanimous)  ||3 ||3:00
|-
! style=background:white colspan=9 |

|-  style="text-align:center; background:#cfc;"
| 2021-08-22|| Win ||align=left| Ryuta Inoue || KNOCK OUT EX 2021 vol.4 || Tokyo, Japan || TKO (Ref.Stop./Punches) || 1 ||2:00

|-  style="text-align:center; background:#cfc;"
| 2021-03-13|| Win ||align=left| Takeru Owaki || KNOCK OUT ～The REBORN～ || Tokyo, Japan || Decision (Unanimous)  || 3 || 3:00

|- align="center"  bgcolor="#cfc"
| 2020-12-06|| Win ||align=left| KotaroZLS ||REBELS 69 || Tokyo, Japan || KO (Right high kick)||1 || 0:51 

|- align="center"  bgcolor="#cfc"
| 2020-08-30|| Win ||align=left| Yuki Chiba ||REBELS 65 || Tokyo, Japan || KO (3 Knockdowns)||1 || 1:59 

|- align="center"  bgcolor="#cfc"
| 2020-07-19|| Win ||align=left| Hiroto Sameshima || Suk Wan Kingthong Rookies || Tokyo, Japan || TKO (Punches)||3 ||2:23  

|- align="center"  bgcolor="#cfc"
| 2020-02-11|| Win ||align=left| Miki Urabayashi || KNOCK OUT CHAMPIONSHIP.1 || Tokyo, Japan || TKO (High kick + punches) ||2 ||2:54

|- align="center"  bgcolor="#cfc"
| 2019-08-10|| Win ||align=left| Shoi ||REBELS 62 || Tokyo, Japan || KO (Right cross)||2 ||0:52  

|- align="center"  bgcolor="#cfc"
| 2019-04-07|| Win ||align=left| Naoki Iijima || Suk Wan Kingthong || Tokyo, Japan || KO||3 ||

|-
| colspan=9 | Legend:    

|-  style="text-align:center; background:#cfc;"
| 2018-05-13|| Win|| align=left| Yuta Takahashi || 1st WMC Japan Amateur|| Tokyo, Japan || Decision  ||2 || 2:00

|-  style="text-align:center; background:#cfc;"
| 2017-07-16|| Win|| align=left| Hirokazu Urahashi || Muay Thai Super Fight Suk Wan Kingthong vol.8|| Tokyo, Japan || Decision  ||2 || 2:00

|-  style="text-align:center; background:#cfc;"
| 2017-06-04|| Win|| align=left| Tomoya Kawashima || Bigbang Amateur 40|| Tokyo, Japan || Decision  ||2 || 1:30

|-  style="text-align:center; background:#cfc;"
| 2017-01-22|| Win|| align=left| Yusei Murai || 5th WINDY Super Fight|| Tokyo, Japan || Decision (Majority) ||3 || 2:00
|-
! style=background:white colspan=9 |

|-  style="text-align:center; background:#fbb;"
| 2015-08-02 || Loss ||align=left| Nadaka Yoshinari || Suk Wan Kingthong Amateur, Tournament Final || Tokyo, Japan || TKO (Referee Stoppage) ||2 || 0:39  
|-
! style=background:white colspan=9 |

|-  style="text-align:center; background:#cfc;"
| 2015-08-02 || Win ||align=left| Eiji Katsura ||  Suk Wan Kingthong Amateur, Tournament Semi Final || Tokyo, Japan || Decision (Unanimous) ||2 || 1:30

|-  style="text-align:center; background:#cfc;"
| 2015-08-02 || Win ||align=left| Kaede Hoshino ||  Suk Wan Kingthong Amateur, Tournament Quarter Final || Tokyo, Japan || Decision (Majority)  ||2 || 1:30

|-  style="text-align:center; background:#cfc;"
| 2014-06-01 || Win||align=left| Shuto Date|| Bigbang Amateur 21 || Tokyo, Japan || Decision || 2 || 1:30

|-  style="text-align:center; background:#cfc;"
| 2013-08-10 || Win||align=left| Asahi Shinagawa || MAJKF KICK GUTS 2013 || Tokyo, Japan || Decision (Unanimous) || 2 || 2:00

|-  style="text-align:center; background:#cfc;"
| 2013-06-02 || Win||align=left| Ryuki Yoshida || Bigbang Amateur 14 || Tokyo, Japan || KO ||  || 

|-  style="text-align:center; background:#fbb;"
| 2012-09-23 || Loss ||align=left| Tensei Nakajo|| MAJKF Kick BREAK-29 -SHARPLY-|| Tokyo, Japan || Decision (Unanimous) || 3 || 1:30 
|-
! style=background:white colspan=9 |
|-
| colspan=9 | Legend:

Mixed rules record

|-
|Win
|align=center|1–0
|Dawsakorn Mor.Tassanai
|KO (left hook to the body)
|INOKI BOM-BA-YE x Ganryujima
|
|align=center|1
|align=center|0:31
|Tokyo, Japan
|Ganryujima rules.

See also
 List of male kickboxers

References

Living people
2001 births
Japanese male kickboxers
Japanese Muay Thai practitioners
People from Sagamihara
Sportspeople from Kanagawa Prefecture